Fa is a concept in Chinese philosophy that covers ethics, logic, and law. It can be translated as "law" in some contexts, but more often as "model" or "standard." First gaining importance in the Mohist school of thought, the concept was principally elaborated in Legalism. In Han Fei's philosophy, the king is the sole source of fa (law), taught to the common people so that there would be a harmonious society free of chance occurrences, disorder, and "appeal to privilege". High officials were not to be held above fa (law or protocol), nor were they to be allowed to independently create their own fa, uniting both executive fiat and rule of law.

Xunzi, a philosopher that would end up being foundational in Han dynasty Confucianism, also took up fa, suggesting that it could only be properly assessed by the Confucian sage, and that the most important fa were the very rituals that Mozi had ridiculed for their ostentatious waste and lack of benefit for the people at large.

Mohism and the School of Names
The concept of fa first gained importance in the Mohist school of thought. To Mozi, a standard must stand "three tests" in order to determine its efficacy and morality. The first of these tests was its origin; if the standard had precedence in the actions or thought of the semi-mythological sage kings of the Xia dynasty whose examples are frequently cited in classical Chinese philosophy. The second test was one of validity; does the model stand up to evidence in the estimation of the people? The third and final test was one of applicability; this final one is a utilitarian estimation of the net good that, if implemented, the standard would have on both the people and the state.

The third test speaks to the fact that to the Mohists, a fa was not simply an abstract model, but an active tool. The real-world use and practical application of fa were vital. Yet fa as models were also used in later Mohist logic as principles used in deductive reasoning. As classical Chinese philosophical logic was based on analogy rather than syllogism, fa were used as benchmarks to determine the validity of logical claims through comparison. There were three fa in particular that were used by these later Mohists (or "Logicians") to assess such claims, which were mentioned earlier. The first was considered a "root" standard, a concern for precedence and origin. The second, a "source", a concern for empiricism. The third, a "use", a concern for the consequence and pragmatic utility of a standard. These three fa were used by the Mohists to both promote social welfare and denounce ostentation or wasteful spending.

See also
Logic in China

References

Concepts in Chinese philosophy
Concepts in logic
Legal concepts
Conceptual models
Confucian ethics
Legalism (Chinese philosophy)